Gagarin International Airport can mean:

 Yuri Gagarin Airport, Angola
 Gagarinsky International Airport